Sabüm is an aboriginal Mon–Khmer language of Malaya, extinct from 2013.

References

Languages of Malaysia
Aslian languages
Extinct languages of Asia